A is a letter of related and vertically oriented alphabets used to write Mongolic and Tungusic languages.

Mongolian language 

Transliterated into Cyrillic with the letter .
 Medial and final forms may be distinguished from those of other tooth-shaped letters through: vowel harmony, the shape of adjacent consonants ( and ), and position in syllable sequence.
  = medial form used after the junction in a proper name compound.
   = connected galik final.
 Derived from Old Uyghur aleph, written twice for isolate and initial forms.
 Produced with  using the Windows Mongolian keyboard layout.
 In the Mongolian Unicode block,  comes before .

Notes

References 

Articles containing Mongolian script text
Mongolic letters
Mongolic languages
Tungusic languages